Copamyntis prays is a species of snout moth in the genus Copamyntis. It is found in Australia.

References

Moths described in 1947
Phycitini